"Nobody Better" is a song by American singer Tina Moore. The original version of the song appears on her 1995 self-titled debut album. Like her previous single "Never Gonna Let You Go", a 2-step garage mix by Kelly G was released on the Delirious label in 1997. It was a top 20 hit in the UK, peaking at No. 20 on the UK Singles Chart in early 1998. Single formats also include another garage remix by Dem 2, 'Dem 2's Luv Unlimited Mix', and an R&B remix by Blacksmith.

Track listing
CD maxi-single
 "Nobody Better" (Kelly G Radio Edit)
 "Nobody Better" (Dem 2's Luv Unlimited Remix)
 "Nobody Better" (Blacksmith R'n'B Rub)
 "Never Gonna Let You Go" (Kelly G Bump-N-Go Vocal Mix)

Charts

References

1995 songs
1997 singles
Tina Moore songs